Frederico Nobre Rosa (6 April 1957 – 17 February 2019), known simply as Frederico, was a Portuguese professional footballer who played as a central defender.

Club career
Frederico was born in Castro Verde, Baixo Alentejo. During his club career he played for CUF, Barreirense, Benfica (having to compete with the likes of Humberto Coelho – his idol – he featured solely as a backup during four years), Boavista (his most steady period, with eight consecutive Primeira Liga seasons, nearly 300 official appearances and team captaincy), Vitória de Guimarães, Estrela da Amadora and Leixões.

Frederico retired in June 1995, at the age of 38.

International career
Frederico won 18 caps and scored five goals for Portugal, being selected for the roster at the 1986 FIFA World Cup in Mexico.

|}

Death
Frederico died on 17 February 2019 aged 61, of amyotrophic lateral sclerosis.

Honours
Benfica
Primeira Liga: 1980–81, 1982–83
Taça de Portugal: 1979–80, 1980–81, 1982–83
Supertaça Cândido de Oliveira: 1980
UEFA Cup runner-up: 1982–83

References

External links

1957 births
2019 deaths
People from Castro Verde
Portuguese footballers
Association football defenders
Primeira Liga players
Liga Portugal 2 players
Segunda Divisão players
G.D. Fabril players
F.C. Barreirense players
S.L. Benfica footballers
Boavista F.C. players
Vitória S.C. players
C.F. Estrela da Amadora players
Leixões S.C. players
Portugal international footballers
1986 FIFA World Cup players
Sportspeople from Beja District